The yo scale, which is like the Mixolydian but does not contain minor notes, according to a traditional theory is a pentatonic scale used in much Japanese music including gagaku and shomyo. The yo scale is used specifically in folk songs and early popular songs and is contrasted with the in scale which does contain minor notes. The in scale is described as 'dark' while the yo scale is described as 'bright' sounding.

It is defined by ascending intervals of two, three, two, two, and three semitones. An example yo scale, expressed in western pitch names, is: D - E - G - A - B.  This is illustrated below.

The Ryūkyū scale appears to be derived from the yo scale with pitches raised.

More recent theory emphasizes that it is more useful in interpreting Japanese melody to view scales on the basis of "nuclear tones" located a fourth apart and containing notes between them, as in the min'yō scale used in folk music, and whose pitches are equivalent to the second mode of the yo scale:

In India's Carnatic music, this scale corresponds to Udayaravichandrika.

Sources

Further reading
Hewitt, Michael. Musical Scales of the World. The Note Tree. 2013. .

Pentatonic scales
Japanese traditional music
Anhemitonic scales
Atritonic scales